Julian Bailey may refer to:
Julian T. Bailey (born 1859), American lawyer, writer and educator
Julian Bailey (racing driver) (born 1961), British racing driver
Julian Bailey (actor) (born 1977), Canadian actor
Julian Bailey (rugby league) (born 1978), Australian rugby player